Robert Bohdan Klymasz (born May 14, 1936, Toronto, Canada) is a Ukrainian-Canadian folklorist. He was a pioneer in the field and published widely in the English language.

Educated at the University of Toronto (Russian, 1957) under George Luckyj, the University of Manitoba (MA in Slavic Studies, under Jaroslav Rudnyckyj, 1960), Harvard University (1960–62), and Indiana University (PhD in Folklore Studies, 1971), he was a long-time Curator of the Slavic and East European Program at the Canadian Museum of Civilization, Ottawa. He has taught at several North American universities, served as executive director of the Ukrainian Cultural and Educational Centre, Winnipeg (1976–78), and for several years an adjunct professor at the Centre for Ukrainian Canadian Studies,  University of Manitoba.

During the 1950s, at the suggestion of Jaroslav Rudnyckyj, Klymasz undertook a research trip to Czechoslovakia and the USSR, specifically western Ukraine, to expand his knowledge of Slavonic studies and do first-hand work in the field. This was a relatively rare event for a Ukrainian Canadian scholar during the Cold War.

During the early 1960s, Klymasz traversed the Canadian prairies recording the folksongs and gathering other materials concerning the early pioneer Ukrainian immigration to Canada. These elderly immigrants and their descendants provided him with a wealth of material with which he was able to construct a portrait of Ukrainian-Canadian folk culture, especially rural culture, as it then existed. Most of these materials are today preserved in archives in Edmonton, Alberta, and Winnipeg, Manitoba and remain valuable resources for contemporary folklorists.

Klymasz's major published works consist of studies in Slavic-Canadian onomastics, and Ukrainian-Canadian folklore, including the groundbreaking Introduction to the Ukrainian-Canadian Immigrant Folksong Cycle (1970), The Ukrainian Winter Folksong Cycle in Canada (1970), and the comprehensive Ukrainian Folklore in Canada (1980). His other contributions to scholarship include studies of subjects as varied as ethnic jokes, Ukrainian-Canadian pictorial art and icons, stories, and various musical genres.

References 
 Robert Klymasz in the Encyclopedia of Music in Canada
 Article in Ukrainian on "Klymash, Robert Bohdan," in Mykhailo Marunchak, Biohrafichnyi dovidnyk do istorii ukraintsiv Kanady (Winnipeg: Ukrainska Vilna Akademiia Nauk v Kanadi, 1986), p. 299.
 Materials on his research trip to Czechoslovakia and Ukraine, based on his personal reminiscences, may be found in the article by Thomas M. Prymak on Oseredok, the Ukrainian Museum and Library in Winnipeg, Manitoba, Canada: https://oseredok.ca/wp-content/uploads/2019/03/A-VISIT-TO-THE-UKRAINIAN-MUSEUM-AND-LIBRARY.pdf

External links 
 Archives of Robert Klymasz (Robert Bohdan Klymasz fonds, MG55/31-No41) are held at Library and Archives Canada

1936 births
Harvard University alumni
Indiana University alumni
Canadian people of Ukrainian descent
Canadian folklorists
Living people
University of Toronto alumni
University of Manitoba alumni
Canadian folk-song collectors
Folklorists of Canadian folklore
Onomastics
Ukrainianists
Canadian curators
Canadian Museum of History Corporation
Ethnic studies in Canada
Culture of the Canadian Prairies
Rural culture in North America
Ethnic jokes